Drago Jelić (16 November 1914 – 11 December 1990) was a Croatian gymnast who competed for Yugoslavia. He competed in eight events at the 1948 Summer Olympics.

References

1914 births
1990 deaths
Croatian male artistic gymnasts
Yugoslav male artistic gymnasts
Olympic gymnasts of Yugoslavia
Gymnasts at the 1948 Summer Olympics
Place of birth missing
20th-century Croatian people